Bab al-Salam (The Gate of Peace) is one of the seven ancient city-gates of Damascus, Syria. During the Roman era, it was also known as "Gate of the Moon".

References

External links
 Old Damascus Gates

History of the Middle East
Gates of Damascus